Johnson Gymnasium is a 4,000-seat multi-purpose arena in Albuquerque, New Mexico, on the campus of the University of New Mexico.  It opened in 1957 and was the home venue of the New Mexico Lobos basketball team until The Pit opened in 1966.  Today, Johnson Gymnasium is the home floor for the Lobo volleyball team.  The gym is named after former Lobos basketball coach, Roy Johnson.

On March 18, 2015, the arena hosted a New Mexico Lobos women's basketball game for the first time when the Lobos took on North Dakota in the first round of the Women's Basketball Invitational. The team's normal venue, The Pit, was not available due to a conflicting Professional Bull Riders event. The Lobos won the game and advanced to the second round where they were defeated by Oral Roberts at the same venue.

References

External links
Venue information

Basketball venues in New Mexico
College basketball venues in the United States
College volleyball venues in the United States
Defunct college basketball venues in the United States
Indoor arenas in New Mexico
New Mexico Lobos
New Mexico Lobos basketball venues
Sports venues in Albuquerque, New Mexico
Volleyball venues in New Mexico
Sports venues completed in 1957
1957 establishments in New Mexico